Asu (also romanized as Āsū and Asow’; also known as Asa) is a village in Alqurat Rural District, in the Central District of Birjand County, South Khorasan Province, Iran. At the 2006 census, its population was 791, in 184 families.

References 

Populated places in Birjand County